Susanne Laschet (née Malangré; born 18 May 1962) is a German bookseller, wife of former Minister-President of North Rhine-Westphalia and Chancellor of Germany candidate Armin Laschet.

Background
Malangré was born to a prominent Aachen family and is the daughter of the prominent business executive Heinrich Malangré and the niece of the city's former lord mayor Kurt Malangré. Her family is of French-speaking Walloon origin and moved from Haine-Saint-Pierre in Belgium to Stolberg in the second half of the 19th century to establish a glass production business.

She trained as a bookseller and is a well-known bookseller in Aachen.

She met Armin Laschet as a child in a Catholic children's choir led by her father; they married in 1985 and have three children. Her husband's grandfather was also from Wallonia.

Public activities

Susanne Laschet became the First Lady of Germany's largest state North Rhine-Westphalia in 2017. As First Lady she was active in philanthropic work. She is the patron of the Müttergenesungswerk, a charitable organisation founded by the First Lady of Germany Elly Heuss-Knapp. She is also the patron of Aktion Lichtblicke.

In 2020 her husband became a candidate to the chairmanship of the CDU and to succeed Angela Merkel as Chancellor of Germany, and was reportedly the candidate favoured by Merkel. However, he still lost.

References

German philanthropists
German women philanthropists
Spouses of German politicians
German people of Belgian descent
1962 births
Living people
20th-century German women
21st-century German women
People from Aachen